Luis Siret y Cels  (26 August 1860, in Sint-Niklaas – 7 June 1934, in Herrerías) was a Belgian-Spanish archaeologist and illustrator.

He was born in Belgium, but when he was 21 he went to Cuevas del Almanzora (Almería) when he was contracted as a Mining Engineer in the Sierra Almagrera.

Through 50 years, Luis Siret and his brother Henri Siret investigated Neolithic, Chalcolithic and Bronze Age sites in Almizaraque, Palacés, El Argar, El Gárcel or Los Millares. His discoveries meant a great advance in the prehistory of the South-eastern Iberian Peninsula and helped settle the sequence from Palaeolithic to Iron Age in the zone.

Material which he collected was exhibited in 1889 Exposition universelle de Paris and 1929 Exposición Universal de Barcelona. Items are currently exhibited in the Museo Arqueológico Provincial de Almería, in the Museo arqueológico Nacional in Madrid, in the Musée du Cinquantenaire in Brussels and several other important collections including the British Museum in London and the Ashmolean Museum in Oxford.

References

Bibliography
Herguido, Carlos, (1994), Apuntes y documentos sobre Enrique y Luis Siret, ingenieros y arqueólogos. Instituto de Estudios Almerienses y Ayuntamiento de Cuevas del Almanzora, Almería.
Herguido, Carlos (ERRATA): http://1drv.ms/1q0FWNb
Siret, Luis y Enrique (2006), Las Primeras Edades del Metal en el Sudeste de España (Facsímil ed.), Museo Arqueológico de Murcia, Murcia, España, MU-584-2006 [9 de julio de 2007]

External links 

Arqueomurcia.com - Tu portal de Arqueología en la Región de Murcia at www.arqueomurcia.com
Patrimur.com - El portal de Patrimonio de la Región de Murcia at patrimur.com
Biografía
Biografía de Canalsur
Biografía de lycos

1860 births
1934 deaths
Belgian archaeologists
19th-century Spanish archaeologists
20th-century Spanish archaeologists
People from Sint-Niklaas